Eleni Stavridou (born 21 October 1973) is a Greek diver. She competed in the women's 3 metre springboard event at the 1992 Summer Olympics.

References

1973 births
Living people
Greek female divers
Olympic divers of Greece
Divers at the 1992 Summer Olympics
Place of birth missing (living people)